The Peters First Nation or Peters Band are a First Nations band government of the Sto:lo people in the area of Hope, British Columbia.

Historically, the name of the First Nation in English was a transcription of the indigenous Halkomelem name (Skw'átets). This was spelt as "Squatits Band". However, presumably due to the coincidental similarity in pronunciation to the ethnic and sexual slur "Squaw", this name has since been abandoned and is no longer used.

The Halkomelem name Skw'átets literally means 'trickling water in the back'. The band was named after trickling water because trees grew on
roots here above ground and water trickled under the trees in seasons when waterfalls were going.

Demographics
Number of Band Members: 65

References

Sto:lo governments
First Nations governments in the Lower Mainland